The Iriri River (Mẽbêngôkre: Kororoti) is a large tributary of the Xingu River in Brazil, in the state of Pará. The headwaters are the traditional home of the Panará people.

Course

The river rises in the  Nascentes da Serra do Cachimbo Biological Reserve, a strictly protected conservation unit established in 2005 in the Serra do Cachimbo. It is one of the headwaters of the Xingu River.
It flows for  before joining the Xingu, running through the  Terra do Meio Ecological Station.
The river varies greatly in volume depending on the season, and in the dry season include waterfalls, rocks and rapids.

The Iriri River flows through the Tapajós–Xingu moist forests ecoregion.
The river is rich in fish, including many species found only here and in the Xingu. Large sections remain unexplored due to its remoteness in a region surrounded by Amazon rainforest, and sections with strong current and cataracts.

References

Sources

Rivers of Pará